David M. Weisbart (January 21, 1915 – July 21, 1967) was an American film editor and producer.

Career
Born in Los Angeles, Weisbart began working as a film editor for Warner Bros. in 1942. Over the next decade, he was involved in the editing of some twenty films, including The Constant Nymph (1943), Mildred Pierce (1945), Night and Day (1946), Dark Passage (1947), The Fountainhead (1949), The Glass Menagerie (1950), and A Streetcar Named Desire (1951). He was nominated for the Academy Award for editing Johnny Belinda (1948).

In 1952, Weisbart became a producer, the youngest under contract to Warner Bros. That same year he produced his first film, Mara Maru, starring Errol Flynn and Ruth Roman. In 1955 he produced the film for which he is probably best remembered: the James Dean classic, Rebel Without a Cause.

Weisbart left Warner Bros. for 20th Century Fox, where he produced Love Me Tender (1956), the first Elvis Presley film. Weisbart would produce three more Presley movies, as well as April Love (1957) for another teen idol, Pat Boone.

With Samuel A. Peeples, Weisbart created the television series Custer, also known as The Legend of Custer, which ran on ABC for seventeen episodes in 1967.

On July 21, 1967, Weisbart died of what was apparently heart failure; he collapsed while playing golf with film director Mark Robson on a Los Angeles golf course. He was 52, and was survived by his wife and two daughters.

At the time of his death, Weisbart was producing the high-profile Valley of the Dolls, based on the novel by Jacqueline Susann. The film was released in December 1967. Although it received scathing reviews, it was 20th Century Fox's biggest box office hit of the year.

Weisbart graduated in 1932 from Fairfax High School in Los Angeles and was President of his graduating class.

References

1915 births
1967 deaths
20th Century Studios people
20th-century American businesspeople
American film editors
American film producers
Film producers from California
People from Los Angeles
Warner Bros. people